Bagmashtu (also known as Bagparti, Bagvarti, Bagbartu) is an Araratian (Urartian) goddess, and the consort or wife of the chief Urartian god Haldi. Although throughout most of Urartu Arubani is known as Khaldi's wife, at the excavation of Musasir references to "Khaldi and his wife, Bagmashtu" were found inscribed on some of the items. It is assumed that when Urartu expanded its territories to include the area Musasir, local gods were incorporated and a new pantheon was created for that region. The locality and addition of Bagmashtu are supported by the fact that her name is of Armenian origin.

References
Piotrovsky, Boris B. (1969) The Ancient Civilization of Urartu: An Archaeological Adventure. Cowles Book Co. 

Urartian deities